Terence Groves (born 27 September 1950) is a South African former cricketer. He played in one List A and eight first-class matches from 1968/69 to 1976/77.

References

External links
 

1950 births
Living people
South African cricketers
Border cricketers
KwaZulu-Natal cricketers
People from Stutterheim
Cricketers from the Eastern Cape